Marco De Nicolo (born 30 September 1976 in Legnano) is an Italian sport shooter who competed in the 2000 Summer Olympics, the 2004 Summer Olympics, the 2008 Summer Olympics  2012 Summer Olympics, the 2016 Summer Olympics and the 2020 Summer Olympics He has competed in the men's 10 m air rifle, the 50 m rifle prone and the 50 m rifle 3 positions.

References

1976 births
Living people
People from Legnano
Italian male sport shooters
ISSF rifle shooters
Olympic shooters of Italy
Sportspeople from the Metropolitan City of Milan
Shooters at the 2000 Summer Olympics
Shooters at the 2004 Summer Olympics
Shooters at the 2008 Summer Olympics
Shooters at the 2012 Summer Olympics
Shooters at the 2016 Summer Olympics
Shooters at the 2015 European Games
European Games silver medalists for Italy
European Games medalists in shooting
Mediterranean Games gold medalists for Italy
Mediterranean Games silver medalists for Italy
Mediterranean Games medalists in shooting
Competitors at the 2013 Mediterranean Games
Shooters at the 2020 Summer Olympics
21st-century Italian people